Mel Fisher (August 21, 1922 – December 19, 1998) was an American treasure hunter best known for finding the 1622 wreck of the Nuestra Señora de Atocha in Florida waters.

Personal life
Fisher was an Indiana-born former chicken farmer who eventually moved to California. He opened the first diving shop in the state, called "See Da Sea". He attended Purdue University. In 1953, he married Dolores (Deo) Horton who became his business partner. She was one of the first women to learn how to dive and set a women's record by staying underwater for 50 hours. Mel and Deo had five children. On July 20, 1975 Fisher's oldest son Dirk, his wife Angel, and diver Rick Gage died after their boat sank due to bilge pump failure. Fisher spent decades treasure hunting in the Florida Keys.

The Atocha
Fisher found the Spanish galleon Nuestra Señora de Atocha named after a parish in Madrid for protection. He discovered silver bars from the wreck in 1973, and in 1975, Dirk found five bronze cannons whose markings would prove to be that of the Atocha. Only days later, Dirk, Angel, and Rick Gage, were killed. The estimated $450 million cache recovered, known as "The Atocha Motherlode," included 40 tons of gold and silver; there were some 114,000 of the Spanish silver coins known as "pieces of eight", gold coins, Colombian emeralds, gold and silver artifacts, and 1000 silver ingots.

Large as it was, this was only roughly half of the treasure that went down with the Atocha. The stern castle of the ship holding more gold and Muzo emeralds has not been found as of August 2017. Also still missing are 300 silver bars and 8 bronze cannons, among other things.

The site of the wreckage of the Atocha, called "The Bank of Spain" (a sandy area 22 feet deep and within 200 yards of the anchor location), is still being worked on and treasures are slowly being recovered. The emeralds from the Atocha are some of the finest emeralds in the world. They come from the Muzo Mine in Colombia. The emeralds of Muzo are renowned for their color, fire, geometry, and as the world’s finest emeralds.

The State of Florida claimed title to the wreck and forced Fisher's company, Treasure Salvors, Inc., into a contract giving 25% of the found treasure to the state. Fisher's company fought the state, claiming the find should be the company's exclusively. After eight years of litigation, the U.S. Supreme Court ruled in favour of Treasure Salvors and it was awarded rights to all found treasure from the vessel on 1 July 1982.

Other finds
Fisher and Treasure Salvors found remains of several other shipwrecks in Florida waters, including the Atocha's sister galleon the Santa Margarita, lost in the same year, and the remains of a slave ship known as the Henrietta Marie, lost in 1700. Mel Fisher's company, Mel Fisher's Treasures, sold the rights to the 1715 Treasure Fleet shipwreck to Queens Jewels, LLC.

Legacy
Fisher hired Duncan Matthewson as chief archaeologist during the Atocha period, and Treasure Salvors, Inc.'s employees became experts in recovery and conservation of underwater artifacts. Fisher agreed to sell Treasure Salvors in 1986 and it remained active as of 2009. Fisher's business continued as Mel Fisher's Treasures. Fisher blended private and public interests when it came to underwater cultural resources. Concern in the U.S., and Florida specifically, for protection of submerged archaeological sites contributed to the 2001 adoption of the UNESCO Convention on the Protection of the Underwater Cultural Heritage.

In popular culture
 Featured in National Geographic Explorer episode Quest for the Atocha Season 2  Episode 16 (1986)
 Featured in City Confidential episode Key West: Pirates in Paradise Season 3, Episode 4 (2000)
 A film about him, Dreams of Gold: The Mel Fisher Story was released in 1986, starring Cliff Robertson and Loretta Swit.
In the novel Supernatural: Bone Key based on the American TV series Supernatural, protagonist Dean Winchester is infused with all of the ghosts on Key West to fight a vengeance spirit called the Last Calusa. Mel Fisher is one of the spirits infused into Dean who relives Mel's burning desire to find the shipwreck. During the battle, Dean is able to use the energy he gets from Mel Fisher and the other ghosts to his advantage and destroy the Last Calusa once and for all.
 Mentioned in the Microsoft Flight Simulator X Mission: Keys Kayakers
 Featured in Travel Channel's Expedition Unknown Season 3 Episode 17

Books regarding Mel Fisher
Lyon, Eugene (1979). The Search for the Atocha.  Harper & Row. 
McHaley, Beth; Tucker, Wendy (1991). Mel Fisher "The World's Greatest Treasure Hunter".  Salvors, Inc. 
Weller, Bob Frogfoot (1996). The Dreamweaver: The Story of Mel Fisher and His Quest for the Treasure of the Spanish Galleon Atocha.  Fletcher and Fletcher. 
Smith, Jedwin (2003). Fatal Treasure: Greed and Death, Emeralds and Gold, and the Obsessive Search for the Legendary Ghost Galleon Atocha.  Wiley. 
Clyne, Pat (2010). The Atocha Odyssey.  Terrell Creative. 
Joynes, Monty (2015). For Love and Treasure: The Life and Times of the World's Most Successful Treasure Hunting Family.  Seaside Books.

See also
Mel Fisher Maritime Heritage Museum
Mel Fisher's Treasure Museum

References

External links

Official website
Mel Fisher Maritime Museum
 
 
 
 

1922 births
1998 deaths
People from Monroe County, Florida
Deaths from cancer in Florida
Treasure hunters